The Africa Movie Academy Awards, popularly known as AMAA and The AMA Awards, is presented annually to recognize excellence among professionals working in, or non-African professionals who have contributed to, the African film industry. It was founded by Peace Anyiam-Osigwe and is run through the Africa Film Academy. The awards are aimed at honouring and promoting excellence in the African movie industry as well as uniting the African continent through arts and culture. The award presentation is attended by numerous media representatives, celebrities, politicians, journalists, actresses and actors from all across the world. The AMA Awards is widely considered to be Africa's most important film event and the most prestigious film award in Africa.

History
The first Africa Movie Academy Awards was held in Yenagoa, Bayelsa State, Nigeria on 30 May 2005. All other subsequent African Academy Awards before 2012 were held at the same venue, except for the 2008 AMAA Awards which was moved to Abuja, FCT for security reasons. In 2012, the awards ceremony was held at Eko Hotels and Suites, Victoria Island, Lagos in Lagos State. The 9th and 10th edition saw AMAA returning to Yenagoa, while the 2015 ceremony was held outside Nigeria for the first time.

Categories

Current categories
As of 2017, the Africa Movie Academy Awards have 28 merit categories. They include:

 Best Short Film: since 2010
 Best Documentary: since 2006
 Best Diaspora Feature: since 2011
 Best Diaspora Documentary: since 2011
 Best Animation: since 2008
 Achievement in Production Design: since 2008
 Achievement in Costume Design: since 2005
 Achievement in Make-Up: since 2005
 Achievement in Soundtrack: since 2005
 Achievement in Visual Effects: since 2005
 Achievement in Sound: since 2005
 Achievement in Cinematography: since 2005
 Achievement in Editing: since 2005
 Best Film by an African Living Abroad: (2008; 2010–2013; 2015–present)
 Best Comedy Film

 Best Actor in a Leading Role: since 2005
 Best Actress in a Leading Role: since 2005
 Best First Feature Film by a Director
 Best Diaspora Short Film
 Achievement in Screenplay: since 2005
 Best Nigerian Film: since 2007
 Best Film in an African Language: since 2005
 Most Promising Actor: since 2006
 Best Child Actor
 Best Actor in a Supporting Role: since 2005
 Best Actress in a Supporting Role: since 2005
 Best Director: since 2005
 Best Film: since 2005

Discontinued categories
Several categories have been renamed, retired, or merged. Below is a list of some of the retired categories.

Special categories
 Lifetime Achievement Awards (2005-2007; 2013–present)
 Special Recognition of Pillars of Nollywood (2013 only)
 Special Jury Award (2012–present)
 Madiba Africa Vision Awards (2014 only)
 Best Film for Women Empowerment (2014 only)

Jury members
 Berni Goldblat 2007–present
 John Akomfrah
 Steve Ayorinde 2005–2015
 Keith Shiri
 June Givanni
 Hyginus Ekwuazi
 Shaibu Husseini
 Ayoku Babu
 Asantewa Olatunji
 Dorothee Wenner 2005–present
 Charles Burnett 2014–present
 Filippe Savadogo 2014–present
 Amaka Igwe 2005

Awards statistics
The statistics below are valid as of the 13th edition (2017).

Most nominations

By a film
10 and up

By a director
Twice and more:

By an actress
Twice and more:

By an actor
Twice and more:

Most wins

By a film
Five times and more:

By country
The "Best Film" category has been won by a Nigerian film for a record six times.

By an actress

By an actor

Other notable records
 Egyptian actor Farouk Al-Fichawi was the first non-Nigerian actor to win an award. He did so for his role in Seventh Heaven.
 Ghanaian actress Jackie Appiah was the first non-Nigerian actress to win an award.

See also

 List of Africa Movie Academy Awards ceremonies

References

External links
 

 
Awards established in 2005
Nigerian film awards